"Twixteen" is a song written by Mary Tarver in 1958 and published by Ted Music, BMI. It was first recorded by Gene Summers and His Rebels in 1958 and issued by Jan/Jane Records. The "Twixteen" recording session took place at the Liberty Records Studios in Hollywood, California and featured René Hall and James McClung on guitar, Plas Johnson on saxophone, Earl Palmer on drums, and George "Red" Callendar on bass. The flipside of "Twixteen" was "I'll Never Be Lonely".

Reviews
Billboard in their January 26, 1959 issue, in the section 'Reviews of New Pop Records' on page 48, commented "She's not yet sixteen, is the meaning of this title according to the chanter on this winning rock and roller. It has a sound and Summers sells it well. It could move".

"Twixteen" cover versions
Runnin' Wild - Belgium
Teddy And The Tigers - Finland
Jimmy Velvit - United States (Re-written vocal adaptation titled " Waitin' For Elvis") (see Sources)

References
Gene Summers discography from Rocky Productions, France
Gene Summers discography from Wangdangdula Finland
Gene Summers session data from Tapio's Fin-A-Billy, Finland

Sources
 Billboard Magazine, January 26, 1959 Reviews of New Pop Records,  page 48 United States
Billboard Magazine, February 2, 1959, page 35 United States
Liner notes "The Ultimate School Of Rock & Roll" 1997 United States
"Cover Versions Of The Songs Made Famous By Gene Summers" 2007  United States
Article and sessionography in issue 15 (1977) of New Kommotion Magazine UK
Article and sessionography in issue 23 (1980) of New Kommotion Magazine UK
Feature article and sessionography in issue 74 (1999) of Rockin' Fifties Magazine Germany
Feature article with photo spread in issue 53 (2000) of Bill Griggs' Rockin' 50s Magazine United States
Feature Article with photo spread in issue 54 (2000) of Bill Griggs' Rockin' 50s Magazine United States
Rockin' With Velvit...the 1960s - Seduction Records SCD-102 CD United States
Rockin' Country Style

1958 songs
Gene Summers songs
American songs
1958 singles
Songs written by Mary Tarver